Wiembecke is a river of North Rhine-Westphalia, Germany. Its source is near the Externsteine in the Teutoburg Forest. It flows through Horn-Bad Meinberg and joins the Werre in Detmold.

In its lower course the Wiembecke is also called Knochenbach and Berlebecke. Traditionally, the Wiembecke is however considered as being a tributary of the Berlebecke.

See also
List of rivers of North Rhine-Westphalia

References

Rivers of North Rhine-Westphalia
Rivers of Germany